Sergio Hierrezuelo Castellanos (15 March 1982) is a retired Cuban athlete who specialised in the 400 metres hurdles. He reached the semifinals of the 2005 World Championships. In addition, early in his career he won the silver medal at the 1999 World Youth Championships.

His personal best in the event is 49.11 seconds, set in 2005.

Competition record

References

Living people
1982 births
Cuban male hurdlers
Athletes (track and field) at the 2003 Pan American Games
Athletes (track and field) at the 2007 Pan American Games
Pan American Games competitors for Cuba
20th-century Cuban people
21st-century Cuban people